{{Infobox election
| election_name      = 2014 Panamanian general election
| country            = Panama
| previous_election  = 2009 Panamanian general election
| previous_year      = 2009
| next_election      = 2019 Panamanian general election
| next_year          = 2019
| election_date      = 

| module = {{Infobox election
| embed = yes
| election_name = Presidential election
| type = presidential
| ongoing = no
| image_size = 130x130px

| image1             = Juan Carlos Varela (2014) 3x4 Cropped.jpg
| nominee1           = Juan Carlos Varela| running_mate1      = Isabel Saint Malo
| party1             = Panameñista Party
| popular_vote1      = 724,762| percentage1        = 39.09%| image2             = Jose Domingo Arias (2013) 4x3 Cropped.jpg
| nominee2           = 
| running_mate2      = Marta Linares de Martinelli
| party2             = Democratic Change (Panama)
| popular_vote2      = 581,828
| percentage2        = 31.38%
| image3             = Juan Carlos Navarro (2013) 3x4 Cropped.png
| nominee3           = 
| running_mate3      = Gerardo Solís
| party3             = Democratic Revolutionary Party
| popular_vote3      = 521,842
| percentage3        = 28.14%
| map_image          = Elecciones_Panamá_Resultados_2014.png
| map_size           = 
| map_caption        = Results by province
| title              = President
| before_election    = Ricardo Martinelli
| before_party       = Democratic Change (Panama)
| after_election     = Juan Carlos Varela
| after_party        = Panameñista Party
}}}}

General elections were held in Panama on 4 May 2014. Due to constitutional term limits, Incumbent President Ricardo Martinelli was ineligible for a second consecutive term. Incumbent Vice President Juan Carlos Varela of the Partido Panameñista was declared the victor with 39% of the votes.

Electoral system
Of the 71 members of the National Assembly, 26 were elected in single-member constituencies and 45 by proportional representation in multi-member constituencies. Each district with more than 40,000 inhabitants forms a constituency. Constituencies elect one MP for every 30,000 residents and an additional representative for every fraction over 10,000.

In single-member constituencies MPs are elected using the first-past-the-post system. In multi-member constituencies MPs are elected using party list proportional representation according to a double quotient; the first allocation of seats uses a simple quotient, further seats are allotted using the quotient divided by two, with any remaining seats are awarded to the parties with the greatest remainder.

Presidential candidates
Seven candidates contested the election:
José Domingo Arias – Cambio Democrático (CD), a former minister in Martinelli's government
Juan Carlos Navarro - Democratic Revolutionary Party (PRD), former mayor of Panama City
Juan Carlos Varela - Panameñista Party, incumbent Vice President
Genaro López - Broad Front for Democracy (FAD), former General Secretary of the SUNTRACS union
Juan Jované - Independent, former head of the Social Security administration, and a left-wing economist
Esteban Rodríguez - Independent
Gerardo Barroso - Independent

Opinion polls

Results
President

National Assembly

Although Democratic Change won 30 seats and MOLIRENA two, rival candidates in 10 of the circuits won by CD and 1 of those won by MOLIRENA said there were irregularities throughout the elections that favored the winning parties. As such, the Electoral Tribunal of Panama''' annulled the results in those circuits and new special elections were to be held every Sunday from 16 November 2014 to determine which candidate would win those 11 seats.

References

Panama
Elections in Panama
2014 in Panama
Presidential elections in Panama